Bluegrass Hootenanny is an album by American country music artists George Jones and Melba Montgomery released in 1964 on the United Artists Records.

Background
Bluegrass Hootenanny was the second duet album by Jones and Montgomery, the first being the bluegrass-tinged What's In Our Heart.  As the title implies, this second Jones/Montgomery collection brings this sound into focus, a departure of sorts for Jones, who was known primarily for his hardcore honky tonk sound and soulful ballad singing.  The album features several bluegrass interpretations of classic country songs written by Bill Monroe, Lester Flatt, and Hank Williams.  Jones co-wrote two songs with Johnny Mathis, the rollicking "Jump In The Mississippi" and the plaintive "I'd Dreamed My Baby Came Home", while "Will There Ever Be Another" and "I'll Be There To Welcome You Home" were co-written by Montgomery.  The album was a hit, reaching number 12 on the country album chart, although not quite as successful as What's In Our Heart had been, which had risen to number three.

Jones and Montgomery would tour together, with Jones confessing in his autobiography I Lived To Tell It All, "My affections for Melba surfaced almost immediately after we began working.  But my drunkenness and the fact that I had a wife did little to make her want to commit to me."  Jones also divulged that he had asked her to marry him but Montgomery had begun a relationship with Jones' guitar player Jack Solomon, whom she would eventually marry.

Track listing 
"Dixieland for Me" (Curtis McPeake, David Watkins)
"Once More" (Dusty Owens)
"Will There Ever Be Another" (Melba Montgomery, Carl Montgomery)
"I'd Jump the Mississippi" (George Jones, Johnny Mathis)
"Please Be My Love" (Monroe Fields, Carl Sauceman)
"I Dreamed My Baby Came Home" (Jones, Mathis)
"Rollin' in My Sweet Baby's Arms" (Lester Flatt)
"Blue Moon of Kentucky" (Bill Monroe)
"House of Gold" (Hank Williams)
"Wait a Little Longer, Please Jesus" (Hazel Houser, Chester Smith)
"I Can't Get Over You" (Joe Barber)
"I'll Be There to Welcome You Home" (Melba Montgomery, Carl Montgomery)

Personnel
 Joe Barber- Composer
 Monroe Fields- Composer
 Hazel Houser-	Composer
 George Jones-	Composer, Guitar, Primary Artist, Vocals
 Johnny "Country"- Mathis Composer
 Curtis McPeake- 5-string Banjo
 Bill Monroe-	Composer
 Carl Montgomery- Composer
 Melba Montgomery- Composer, Primary Artist
 Dusty Owens-	Composer
 Carl Sauceman- Composer
 Chester Smith- Composer
 David Watkins- Composer
 Hank Williams- Composer

References

External links
 George Jones' Official Website
 Bluegrass Hootenanny at  http://www.allmusic.com/

1964 albums
George Jones albums
United Artists Records albums
Melba Montgomery albums
Albums produced by Pappy Daily
Vocal duet albums